Forno is an Italian and Portuguese word meaning "oven". It may refer to several places:

Italy
Forno (Massa), a hamlet of Massa, in the Province of Massa and Carrara, Tuscany
Forno (Moena), a hamlet of Moena, in the Province of Trento, Trentino-Südtirol
Forno (Rocca Santa Maria), a hamlet of Rocca Santa Maria, in the Province of Teramo, Abruzzo
Forno Canavese, a municipality of the Province of Turin, Piedmont
Forno di Zoldo, a municipality of the Province of Belluno, Veneto

Portugal
Forno, a locality of Santa Bárbara, Vila do Porto municipality, Azores
Forno, a locality of Aguada de Cima, Águeda municipality, Centro Region

See also
Al forno
Forni (disambiguation)